The Butterfly Lifts the Cat Up or  De Vlinder Tilt de kat op  is a 1994 Dutch film directed by Willeke van Ammelrooy.

Cast
Arjan Kindermans	... 	David
Marjolein Beumer	... 	Linda
Rik Launspach	... 	Anton
Karla Wieringa	... 	Marjan
Joost van Hezik	... 	Robert
Jules Croiset	... 	huisarts
Duco Luitse	... 	Alexander
Josée Ruiter	... 	wijkverpleegster
Marnix Kappers	... 	zanger
Hugo Vanex	... 	pianist
Yolanda Zwartjes	... 	barvrouw
Eugene Reisser	... 	zwerver
Peter Vos	... 	zwerver
Paul van der Plas	... 	bouwvakker
Dennis Overweg	... 	bouwvakker
Bas van de Berg ... Kleine Henk

External links 
 

Dutch drama films
1994 films
1990s Dutch-language films